This is a list of Italian constituencies from 1946 to present. For the election of the Italian Chamber of Deputies, since 1993 Italy is divided in 27 districts called circoscrizioni. However, the distribution of seats being calculated at national level, districts serve only to choose the single candidates inside the party lists. During the election of the Italian Senate, according to the Constitution, each Region is a single district, without connections at national level.

During the Regional elections, the districts correspond to the Provinces, even if some seats are allocated at regional level. For the Provincial elections, a special system is used, based on localized lists: even if the competition is disputed on provincial level, candidates are presented in single-member districts, and their final position inside each party list depends by the percentage of votes they received in their own districts. Finally, for the Communal elections no districts are used.

Electoral districts for the Chamber of Deputies from 1994 to 2006

Aosta Valley

Piedmont 1

Piedmont 2

Lombardy 1

Lombardy 2

Lombardy 3

Trentino-Alto Adige/Südtirol

Veneto 1

Veneto 2

Friuli-Venezia Giulia

Liguria

Emilia-Romagna

Tuscany

Umbria

Marche

Lazio 1

Lazio 2

Abruzzo

Molise

Campania 1

Campania 2

Apulia

Basilicata

Calabria

Sicily 1

Sicily 2

Sardinia

References

Elections in Italy
Chamber of Deputies (Italy)
Italy